La Grande is an unincorporated community and census-designated place in Pierce County, Washington, United States. La Grande has a post office with ZIP code 98348.

Climate
This region experiences warm (but not hot) and dry summers, with no average monthly temperatures above 71.6 °F (22 °C). According to the Köppen Climate Classification system, La Grande has a warm-summer Mediterranean climate, abbreviated "Csb" on climate maps.

References

External link

Census-designated places in Pierce County, Washington
Census-designated places in Washington (state)
Unincorporated communities in Pierce County, Washington
Unincorporated communities in Washington (state)